Queen of the Nile  may refer to:

A common epithet for Cleopatra VII of Egypt
Queen of the Nile (The Twilight Zone), an episode of The Twilight Zone
The American title to the film Nefertiti, Queen of the Nile
A song by the hard rock band Dangerous Toys